Big Bang (lit. "I'll Shoot") is a 2007 South Korean action-comedy film written and directed by Park Jung-woo, and starring Kam Woo-sung and Kim Su-ro.

Plot
Park Man-soo is an ordinary salaryman who lives his life according to a strict set of rules, and this lack of flexibility makes him hard to like at home and at the office. One day, his wife asks for a divorce because she's bored with their life, and he is fired because his corrupt boss hates him. So on his way home, the frustrated and outraged Man-soo tries to set himself free by breaking all the rules that have restricted him his entire life by deviating from them, just for one day. He swears at passers-by, kicks signboards and pees on the street, and he is soon placed under arrest by Ma Dong-chul, a demoted but zealous cop. Officer Ma takes him to the police station to teach him a lesson, where Man-soo meets Yang Chul-gon, a career criminal with 15 previous convictions, who finds it more comfortable to be behind bars. Chul-gon incites the desperate and timid Man-soo to escape the police station with him, and through a series of mishaps, they happen to steal a gun and police car, with which they also try their hand at punishing "law dodgers" themselves. With Officer Ma in hot pursuit, Man-soo and Chul-gon find themselves branded as antisocial vigilantes, and the  fine for Man-soo's original misdemeanor has now turned into a potential life sentence. Thus, the unlikely pair spend a wild night together in Seoul.

Cast
 Kam Woo-sung as Park Man-soo
 Kim Su-ro as Yang Chul-gon
 Kang Sung-jin as Ma Dong-chul
 Moon Jung-hee as Han Kyung-soon, Man-soo's wife
 Jang Hang-sun as Shim Pyung-seob
 Kim Young-ok as Chul-gon's mother
 Jo Seok-hyun as Section chief Kim
 Jeon Guk-hwan as Man-soo's father
 Lee Jeong-heon as Seo Tae-hoon
 Kim Hyuk as Shim Tae-yong
 Choi Jung-woo as Section Chief Detective
 Kim Se-dong as Police Sergeant Kim
 Park Jin-taek as Police Corporal Park
 Park Gun-tae as young Man-soo
 Park Jin-young as Kyung-soon's father

References

External links
  
 
 
 

2007 films
South Korean action comedy films
2000s Korean-language films
Showbox films
Films directed by Park Jung-woo
2007 action comedy films
2000s South Korean films